Goodbye Solo is a 2008 American independent film written and directed by Ramin Bahrani. It premiered as an official selection of the 2008 Venice Film Festival where it won the international film critic's FIPRESCI award for best film, and later had its North American premiere at the 2008 Toronto International Film Festival. The film was distributed by Roadside Attractions. The film exhibits significant thematic and plot similarities to Abbas Kiarostami's 1997 film Taste of Cherry.

Plot
Solo, a Senegalese cab driver, is working to provide a better life for his young family in Winston-Salem, North Carolina. William, an old man with a lifetime of regrets, hires Solo to take him to Blowing Rock, a peak in which updrafts cause objects that are dropped from it to fly upwards. William does not ask for a ride back from the rock and is obviously depressed, so Solo assumes that the old man intends to commit suicide there. Solo befriends William, in hopes of talking him out of ending his life. He introduces William to his wife and his stepdaughter Alex, hoping to inspire the old man with the joys of life.
Solo takes William in his taxi to Blowing Rock, and returns without him.

Cast
 Souléymane Sy Savané as Solo
 Red West as William
 Diana Franco Galindo as Alex

Reception
On review aggregator Rotten Tomatoes, 94% of 108 critics gave the film a positive review. The site’s consensus reads, "An original and thoughtful human drama, Goodbye Solo looks at relationships and loneliness while proving director Ramin Bahrani's is an important American voice."

The film was hailed as "A force of nature" by critic Roger Ebert, who awarded it four out of four stars. The New York Times A.O. Scott said it has "...an uncanny ability to enlarge your perception of the world."

Awards
In 2008, Goodbye Solo won the Venice Film Festival’s FIPRESCI International Critics Prize. It was also named one of the Top Ten Independent Films of 2009 by the National Board of Review. 

Souléymane Sy Savané was nominated for Best Male Lead for the 2010 Independent Spirit Awards.

References

External links
 
 
 

2008 films
2008 drama films
2008 independent films
American drama films
Films about taxis
Films about suicide
Films directed by Ramin Bahrani
Films set in North Carolina
Films shot in North Carolina
American independent films
2000s English-language films
2000s American films